Dharampeth College is a metro station in Maharashtra, India, on the Aqua Line of the Nagpur Metro. It was opened on 6 April 2021.

The station was designed on an aqua theme and covers an area of 5,427.03 square meters.

Station Layout

References

Nagpur Metro stations
Railway stations in India opened in 2021